Christian Lavieille (born 16 December 1965) is a French racing driver and former motorcycle road racer.

As a motorcycle racer, he won the FIM Endurance World Championship in 1998 and the Bol d'Or three times (1996, 1999 and 2001).

24 Hours of Le Mans results

References

External links

1964 births
Living people
French racing drivers
French motorcycle racers
Off-road racing drivers
24 Hours of Le Mans drivers
Dakar Rally drivers
Sportspeople from Villefranche-sur-Saône